Newport Centre, commonly known as Newport Mall, is a shopping mall in Jersey City, New Jersey, that opened in 1987. It is a major component of the enormous Newport, Jersey City, a mixed-use community on the Hudson River waterfront across from Lower Manhattan. One of eleven shopping malls in New Jersey managed by Simon Property Group, it is located at 30 Mall Drive West, and is bound by Henderson Street on the west, Mall Drive East on the east, 6th Street on the south, and Newport Parkway on the north. The super-regional mall is the first of its size in Hudson County. The anchor stores are AMC Theatres, Sears, JCPenney, Macy's, and Kohl's.

Stores 

The mall, with four anchors and 167 other stores and attractions, partially opened to the public in October 1987 with Sears and Stern's as two of the four anchors operating. The  was intended to draw residents from the new Newport waterfront development and the surrounding area, as well as shoppers from Bergen County, where blue laws keep shopping malls closed on Sundays.

The mall's official opening was on November 12, 1987. It was attended by New Jersey Governor Thomas Kean, Senator Frank Lautenberg, and The Smurfs. On that date the mall contained 75 tenants, featuring the two aforementioned anchor stores, Sam Goody, Benetton, Eddie Bauer and Hallmark.

There are three floors to the mall complex. The mall is part of the Newport Complex, which includes the Newport Tower, the sixth tallest building in Jersey City. Both it and the Hudson Mall are in an "Urban Enterprise Zone", reducing the state sales tax on purchases from 6.625% to 3.3125% at eligible merchants (with no sales tax on clothing).

The mall is anchored by JCPenney, Kohl's, Macy's, and Sears.

Transportation 

The mall can be reached via the Hudson–Bergen Light Rail's Pavonia/Newport station and the PATH's Newport station. It is also served by New Jersey Transit buses and is the terminus for routes from Jersey City Heights and the North Hudson towns of Guttenberg, North Bergen, West New York, and Union City.

Temporary closure in 2020
On March 16, 2020, Jersey City Mayor Steve Fulop ordered the Newport Centre to be closed due to the COVID-19 pandemic. The next day, New Jersey Governor Phil Murphy backed this temporary closure and ordered all malls in New Jersey to temporarily close as well. It reopened on June 29, 2020.

References

External links

 Newport Centre official website

Buildings and structures in Jersey City, New Jersey
Shopping malls in New Jersey
Shopping malls established in 1987
Tourist attractions in Jersey City, New Jersey
Shopping malls in the New York metropolitan area
1987 establishments in New Jersey